The Floods Directive (Directive 2007/60/EC) is legislation in the European Parliament on the assessment and management of flood risks. The floods directive basically prescribes a three-step procedure:

First step: Preliminary Flood Risk Assessment:
The Floods Directive requires Member States to engage their government departments, agencies and other bodies to draw up a Preliminary Flood Risk Assessment. This assessment has to consider impacts on human health and life, the environment, cultural heritage and economic activity, with a legislative completion date of December 2011.

Second step: Risk Assessment:
The information in this assessment will be used to identify the areas at significant risk which will then be modelled in order to produce flood hazard and risk maps. These maps are to be in place by December 2013 and will include detail on the flood extent, depth and level for three risk scenarios (high, medium and low probability).

Third step: Flood Risk Management Plans:
Flood Risk Management Plans are meant to indicate to policy makers, developers, and the public the nature of the risk and the measures proposed to manage these risks. However, they are not formally binding (e.g. to land-use planning). The Flood Risk Management Plans are to be complete by December 2015. The Floods Directive prescribes an active involvement of all interested stakeholders in the process. The management plans are to focus on prevention, protection and preparedness. Also, flood risk management plans shall take into account the relevant environmental objectives of Article 4 of Directive 2000/60/EC, commonly known as the 'Water Framework Directive'.

Transposition 

The Floods Directive was transposed into Northern Ireland regulation in November 2009 and is called, "The Water Environment (Floods Directive) Regulations (Northern Ireland) 2009".

See also 
 2010 Romanian floods
 2010 Slovenia floods
 2010 Var floods
 List of floods in Europe
 River basin management plans
 Rivers Agency
 Water pollution
 Hazard map

References

External links 
Implementation of the floods directive in selected EU member states – Nones 2015

European Union directives
Flood control in Europe